Maribyrnong is an inner-city suburb in Melbourne, Victoria, Australia,  north-west of Melbourne's Central Business District, located within the City of Maribyrnong local government area.

Located in the River Ward of the City of Maribyrnong, Maribyrnong takes its name from the Maribyrnong River which bounds the suburb to the north and east. Its other borders are Williamson Road, Rosamond Road, Mephan Street and Owen Street to the south.

Maribyrnong contains Highpoint Shopping Centre, one of Australia's largest shopping centres.

History

Maribyrnong lies on the traditional land of the Wurundjeri Woi Wurrung and Bunurong peoples of the Kulin Nation. Aboriginal people have lived in the Maribyrnong River valley for at least 40,000 years, and the name Maribyrnong derives from the phrase 'Mirring-gnay-bir-nong', meaning 'I can hear a ringtail possum'.

A Maribyrnong Post Office opened on 19 March 1881 and closed in 1887. It reopened in 1912 and closed again in 1975. There is currently an Australia Post shop at Highpoint Shopping Centre.

Maribyrnong is home to the Department of Defence ammunitions factory and storage facility. Although many of the buildings are now disused, the site has now been earmarked for development by the State Government for housing and low density commercial infrastructure.

Maribyrnong contains several schools, both Catholic and State Government run. Maribyrnong College (est 1958) is the sole high school in the suburb, which recently underwent significant renovations by the State Government. St Margarets Catholic Primary School and nearby Footscray North Primary School both cater for primary school aged children in the area.

There are also kindergarten and child care centres within Maribyrnong.

Demographics

The most common ancestries in Maribyrnong were English 13.4%, Chinese 13.4%, Australian 12.4%, Vietnamese 10.4% and Italian 7.5%. The most common countries of birth outside Australia were Vietnam 11.1%, China (excludes SARs and Taiwan) 5.0%, India 2.5%, Italy 1.8% and England 1.8%.

In Maribyrnong 45.5% of people only spoke English at home. Other languages spoken at home included Vietnamese 13.1%, Cantonese 6.8%, Mandarin 5.1%, Italian 3.8% and Spanish 2.0%.

The most common responses for religion in Maribyrnong were Catholic 33.1%, No Religion 22.4%, Buddhism 11.7%, Eastern Orthodox 5.4% and Anglican 4.9%.

Flora and fauna

Many native species exist along the Maribyrnong River. Some species thrive in the area. The most noticeable are;
 Rainbow lorikeet
 Common brushtail possum
 Flying foxes or fruit bat Pteropus
 Cockatoo

Maribyrnong has a number of parks mostly near the Maribyrnong River. These reserves are typically unsuitable for development due to the risk of flooding and have been established as gardens and reserves for locals to enjoy.

Places of worship

There is only one place of worship throughout the entire suburb of Maribyrnong – a church in the Roman Catholic tradition. St Margaret's, which is the namesake of the Catholic primary school, is part of the Parish of Ascot Vale and shares the same priest which conducts services at St Mary's in Ascot Vale.

Climate

Sport

Maribyrnong Aquatic Centre
The Maribyrnong Aquatic Centre was established in 2006.

Tracey's Speedway
Maribyrnong Reserve was utilised as a racetrack for various motor sport events during the 1950s before closing in 1964. Still located at the ground are two free standing grandstands which have been refurbished at various times. In most cases the stands are rarely used for spectator events, and instead act as changing rooms for local sports clubs which use the indoor facilities. Today the ground acts as a soccer pitch during winter months, and is also utilised by St Margaret's Primary School for Australian rules football matches.

Transport

Trains
No trains run through the suburb. The nearest train stations are Ascot Vale on the Craigieburn line, Footscray on the Sunbury, Werribee and Williamstown lines and West Footscray on the Sunbury line.

Tram
Yarra Trams's route 57 provides public transport from Flinders Street station (Elizabeth and Flinders Streets) in the city to West Maribyrnong, running through Ascot Vale, Flemington and North Melbourne.

Route 82 tram provides public transport from Moonee Ponds Junction to Footscray (Leeds and Irving Streets). It is one of only two Melbourne tram routes which does not travel through the Melbourne CBD.

Buses
There are also several bus routes that pass through Maribyrnong, many terminating at Highpoint Shopping Centre. Buses operate to Caroline Springs, Avondale Heights, Keilor East and Essendon. The introduction of Melbourne's first orbital bus line, SmartBus route 903, runs just north of Maribyrnong along Buckley Street in Essendon.
Bus Lines running through Maribyrnong include the 215, 223, 406, 407, 408, 409, and 468. Weekend night bus 952 runs through Maribyrnong as well.

Walking and cycling

The suburb adjoins the Maribyrnong River Trail which is used by commuting and recreational cyclists along the Maribyrnong River. There are also numerous bike and walking trails which link the suburb to various other suburbs and take in some of the western suburbs greatest natural beauties, such as Pipemakers Park, Afton Street Conservation Reserve and Footscray Park.

Heritage sites

Maribyrnong contains a number of heritage-listed sites, including:

 Cordite Avenue: Defence Explosive Factory Maribyrnong
 2 Van Ness Avenue: Pipemakers Park Complex
 off La Scala Avenue: Jack's Magazine
 Wests Road and Waterford Avenue: Royal Australian Field Artillery Barracks
 149A and 149B Raleigh Road: Maribyrnong Tram Substation

Recent developments

Despite being an inner city suburb, like many western suburbs, there are significant areas of land within Maribyrnong that have not yet been developed. Mostly owned by the Federal Government for the Department of Defence, the land is now seen as a prime opportunity for housing developments. The most notable development recently under construction is the Delfin Lend Lease Edgewater Estate, located near Highpoint on Gordon Street, which takes in spectacular city views and is adjacent to the historic Jack's Magazine.

The largest development to be announced by the State Government is the 128 hectare Maribyrnong Explosives Factory site, bounded by the Maribyrnong River. 3,000 new homes are expected to be built, along with open parkland, shops and the inclusion of many decades old defence buildings in keeping with heritage. Construction was expected to commence in 2012 but has not yet started, the project should take 10 – 15 years to be fully completed.

See also
 City of Footscray – Parts of Maribyrnong were previously within this former local government area.
 City of Sunshine – Parts of Maribyrnong were previously within this former local government area.

References

  Parks Victoria Brimbank Park page Sept 2007
  Maribyrnong River Parks Victoria page Sept 2007

External links
 Australian Places – Maribyrnong

 
Suburbs of Melbourne
Suburbs of the City of Maribyrnong